Jorge Alberto De Olivera (born 21 August 1982 in Posadas) is an Argentine football goalkeeper who plays for Primera Nacional side Independiente Rivadavia.

Career
De Olivera began his playing career in 2002 with Nueva Chicago in the Primera División. He made his league debut on 5 July 2003 in a 0-3 home defeat to Banfield. After Nueva Chicago were relegated in 2004 De Olivera joined Colón de Santa Fe where he became the second choice goalkeeper after Laureano Tombolini. After only 6 appearances in 2 seasons he had short stints with Olimpo de Bahía Blanca and Aldosivi of the 2nd division.

In 2007, he returned to Nueva Chicago, but was unable to help prevent the club from suffering their second consecutive relegation to the regionalised 3rd division. He remained with the club for another season but after they failed to win promotion back to the 2nd tier he joined Primera División side Racing Club in 2009.

External links
 
 
 Jorge De Olivera on Guaraní Antonio Franco website
 

1982 births
Living people
People from Posadas, Misiones
Argentine footballers
Argentine expatriate footballers
Association football goalkeepers
Nueva Chicago footballers
Club Atlético Colón footballers
Olimpo footballers
Aldosivi footballers
Cobreloa footballers
Racing Club de Avellaneda footballers
Club Rubio Ñu footballers
Guaraní Antonio Franco footballers
Deportivo Pasto footballers
Club Atlético Platense footballers
Independiente Rivadavia footballers
Argentine Primera División players
Primera B de Chile players
Paraguayan Primera División players
Argentine expatriate sportspeople in Chile
Argentine expatriate sportspeople in Paraguay
Expatriate footballers in Chile
Expatriate footballers in Paraguay
Sportspeople from Misiones Province